Lidové noviny (People's News, or The People's Newspaper) is a daily newspaper published in Prague, the Czech Republic. It is the oldest Czech daily still in print, and a newspaper of record. It is a national news daily covering political, economic, cultural and scientific affairs, mostly with a centre-right, conservative view. It often hosts commentaries and opinions of prominent personalities from the Czech Republic and from abroad.

History and profile
Lidové noviny was founded by Adolf Stránský in 1893 in Brno. Its high prestige was due to the number of famous Czech personalities that were contributing—writers, politicians and philosophers—and its attention toward foreign politics and culture. It was also the first Czech daily publishing political cartoons. Its publication was interrupted during World War II. It changed its name to Svobodné noviny after the liberation before returning to the original name from May 9, 1948. It was closed down in 1952.

In 1987 a group of political dissidents led by Jiří Ruml, Jiří Dienstbier, Ladislav Hejdánek, and Jan Petránek recommenced the publication in a monthly samizdat version. In the autumn two "zero editions" were published and in January 1988 the first edition was issued. The paper has its headquarters in Prague. Since November 1989 it is being published legally and since the spring 1990 as a daily. Some years later it was  merged with dissolving Lidová demokracie, from which they inherited the blue colour of the title.

In 1998 Lidové noviny became part of the German group Rheinisch-Bergische Druckerei und Verlagsgesellschaft GmbH (the publisher of the daily Rheinische Post in Germany) and its Czech subsidiary Mafra a.s., that is also publisher of the second largest Czech daily Mladá fronta Dnes, the Czech edition of the freesheet Metro, the TV music channel Óčko, the radio stations Expresradio and Rádio Classic FM and the weekly music magazine Filter. In 2013, MAFRA a.s. became a subsidiary of the Agrofert group, a company owned by the Czech Prime Minister (as of 2018), Andrej Babiš. The publisher of the daily is Lidové noviny AS. The paper is published in Berliner format.

Circulation
Lidové noviny had a circulation of 270,000 copies in June 1990. The circulation of the paper was 91,000 copies in 2002. In October 2003, the paper had a circulation of 77,558 copies. In December 2004 the paper had a circulation of 70,593 copies. It was 72,000 copies for 2004 as a whole.

The 2007 circulation of the paper was 70,680 copies. In 2008 it had a circulation of 70,413 copies and reached up to 232,000 readers per day. The circulation of Lidové noviny was 58,543 copies in 2009, 49,920 copies in 2010 and 43,171 copies in 2011.

Personalities
Among the contributors and editors of the "old" Lidové noviny, there were Karel Čapek, Josef Čapek, Jaromír John, Richard Weiner, Eduard Bass, Karel Poláček, Rudolf Těsnohlídek, Leoš Janáček, Jiří Mahen, Jan Drda, Václav Řezáč and the presidents Tomáš Garrigue Masaryk and Edvard Beneš.

Editors 
This list includes only editors-in-chief of the new Lidové noviny.
 Jiří Ruml (1988–1990)
 Rudolf Zeman (1990–1991)
 Jaroslav Veis (1991–1992)
 Tomáš Smetánka (1992–1993)
 Jaromír Štětina (1993–1994)
 Jiří Kryšpín (1994) – interim
 Libor Ševčík (1994–1996)
 Jefim Fištejn (1996–1997)
 Pavel Šafr (1997–2000)
 Veselin Vačkov (2000–2009)
 Dalibor Balšínek (2009-2013)
 István Léko (2013-2021)
 Petr Bušta (2021-)

See also
 List of newspapers in the Czech Republic
 Concentration of media ownership in the Czech Republic
 Petr Janyška

References

External links 
 Lidovky.cz - zprávy z domova i ze světa | Official page 

Newspapers established in 1893
Daily newspapers published in the Czech Republic
Czech-language newspapers
Newspapers published in Prague